Beth Chatto  (27 June 1923 – 13 May 2018) was an English plantswoman, garden designer and author known for creating and describing the Beth Chatto Gardens near Elmstead Market in the English county of Essex. She wrote several books about gardening under specific conditions and lectured on this in Britain, North America, Australia, the Netherlands and Germany. Her principle of placing the right plant in the right place drew on her husband Andrew Chatto's lifelong research into garden-plant origins.

Biography
Chatto was born at Good Easter, Essex, England, the daughter of Bessie (née Styles) and William Little, both enthusiastic gardeners. Named Bessie Diana, she used the name Beth from her twenties onwards. She attended Colchester County High School for Girls and trained to be a teacher at Hockerill College, Bishop's Stortford from 1940 to 1943.

In the early 1940s, she met Andrew Chatto, a fruit farmer, grandson of the founder of the publishing firm Chatto & Windus. Their shared love of plants helped to bring them together and they married in 1943. The couple lived in Braiswick, Colchester, where their two daughters, Diana and Mary, were born in 1946 and 1948. In 1960 they moved into the new White Barn House, built on the farm at Elmstead Market. Andrew died in 1999.

The couple met Sir Cedric Morris, whose art school at Benton End in Hadleigh, Suffolk attracted artists such as Francis Bacon and Lucian Freud, who later gained fame. Beth Chatto learned about plants from Morris, but was dismayed when he advised her to move house if she wanted to create a great garden. Chatto had a friend who lived nearby named Pamela Underwood, who had a nursery and was keen on flower arranging. She persuaded Chatto to get involved and they were two of the founder members of the second flower arranging club in the country, in Colchester. From the late 1950s, Chatto was involved in the Flower Club movement, lecturing, opening new clubs and demonstrating flower arranging. Members became an enthusiastic audience for unusual plants and a mail order business began from a small hand-typed sheet. From 1960, the Chattos worked on developing the Chatto Gardens and in 1967 the nursery was opened. In 1978 Chatto's first book, The Dry Garden, was published by J. M. Dent.

Chatto died at the age of 94, on 13 May 2018.

In her later years, Chatto commissioned author Catherine Horwood to write about her life and her work. Beth Chatto: A Life with Plants was published in 2019 by Pimpernel Press.

The Beth Chatto Gardens
Construction of the Beth Chatto Gardens at Elmstead Market near Colchester began in 1960. It was attached to the Chatto family home, on land that had previously belonged to the Chatto family fruit farm. It had not been farmed before, as the soil was considered too dry in places, too wet in others and the whole area had been allowed to grow wild with blackthorn, willow and brambles. The only plants to survive from the earliest days are the ancient boundary oaks surrounding the Garden.
 
The Beth Chatto Gardens comprise a varied range of planting sites totalling , including dry, sun baked gravel, water and marginal planting, woodland, shady, heavy clay and alpine planting. They now include the Gravel Garden, Woodland Garden, Water Garden, Long Shady Walk, Reservoir Garden (redesigned by the Head Gardener, Asa Gregers-Warg, and the Garden and Nursery Director, David Ward, with input from Beth) and Scree Garden. The development of these sites prompted Beth Chatto to write books on gardening about what could be considered as "problem areas", using plants that nature has developed to survive under differing conditions.

Beth Chatto lived in the white house in the midst of the gardens. She worked with a team on developing the gardens and continued to inspect and approve their work until the day before she died. She contributed to articles for the international and national press and appeared in international media.

Exhibitions
In January 1975 Chatto created a small winter garden at one of the Royal Horticultural Society Halls, London SW1. More exhibits followed and eventually the Beth Chatto Gardens "Unusual Plants" exhibition arrived at the Chelsea Flower Show. Exhibits by "Unusual Plants" were awarded ten consecutive Gold Medals at the Chelsea Flower Show from 1977 to 1987, except that she did not exhibit in 1983. Exhibits by the Beth Chatto Gardens can still be seen at the Tendring Hundred Show in Essex.

List of publications
Beth Chatto was the author of many gardening books, including an exchange of letters with her friend and fellow gardener and writer Christopher Lloyd:

 (out of print)

 (out of print, rev. ed. Beth Chatto's Green Tapestry: Perennial Plants for Your Garden, London, England, HarperCollins, 1999) 

 (reprinted in 2016 as Drought-Resistant Planting)

 (previously Beth Chatto's Woodland Garden, 2008)

Honours and awards
1987: Awarded the Lawrence Memorial Medal
1987: Awarded the RHS Victoria Medal of Honour
1987: Awarded an honorary degree by the University of Essex
1995: Selected to the International Professional and Business Women's Hall of Fame for outstanding achievements in introducing plant ecology to garden design
1998: Presented with the Life Time Achievement Award by the Garden Writers Guild
2002: Appointed an Officer of the Order of the British Empire (OBE) in the Queen's Birthday Honours
2009: Awarded an honorary degree by the Anglia Ruskin University
2011: Named a Paul Harris Fellow by Colchester Trinity Rotary Club
2014: Awarded the Society of Garden Design's John Brookes Lifetime Achievement Award

Legacy
The Beth Chatto Education Trust was founded to engage all age groups with plants and gardens, and to take an ecological approach to them. The trust also sponsors the Beth Chatto Environmental Award, under the auspices of the Garden Media Guild.

The Society of Garden Designers has created a Beth Chatto Eco Garden Award to be assigned from 2020 onwards. It will focus on the ecological impact of garden designs.

References

Other sources

The Beth Chatto Gardens Guide Book: Early Beginnings

External links
Official site

1923 births
2018 deaths
People from Tendring (district)
British people of English descent
English gardeners
English garden writers
Writers from Essex
English landscape and garden designers
Officers of the Order of the British Empire
Victoria Medal of Honour recipients
Chatto family
People educated at Colchester County High School